Greater Southwest International Airport , originally Amon Carter Field, was the commercial airport serving Fort Worth, Texas, from 1953 until 1974. Dallas/Fort Worth International Airport opened in 1974 a few miles north to replace Greater Southwest and Dallas Love Field as a single airport for the Dallas-Fort Worth Metroplex (though Love Field survives). The area is now a commercial/light-industrial park serving DFW International, centered along Amon Carter Boulevard, which follows the old north-south runway.

Early history
As far back as 1927 the cities of Fort Worth and Dallas had proposed a regional airport that would serve the entire metropolitan area. Initial plans did not come to fruition, and after World War II, Fort Worth decided to move the primary airline traffic from Meacham Field to a new facility, Amon Carter Field. Fort Worth annexed a finger of land to the east, extending the city limits to encompass the new site.

American, Braniff, Central, Continental, Delta, Eastern, Frontier, and Trans-Texas Airways operated from the airport, which had three paved runways and an elaborate terminal (with gold-plated murals). The airport never reached capacity and saw its traffic dwindle while traffic at Love Field in Dallas continued to grow.

Airport diagram for 1955

The April 1957 OAG lists 97 scheduled departures a day Tuesday to Thursday, more than half to nearby Dallas Love Field. American Airlines had 30, Braniff 22, Trans-Texas 19, Continental 13, Delta 7 and Central 6.

On December 20, 1959, jet service began with American Airlines Boeing 707 flights to Los Angeles. Delta Air Lines later started Convair 880 jet nonstops to Los Angeles and New Orleans.  Also in 1959, Continental Airlines was operating Vickers Viscount turboprop service from the airport nonstop to Abilene, Midland/Odessa, TX and Lubbock as well as direct, no change of plane Viscount flights to Albuquerque, El Paso, Santa Fe, NM and Clovis, NM.

In 1960, the airport was renamed Greater Southwest International Airport (GSW) in a failed attempt to attract passengers. In the same year, the city of Fort Worth purchased the airport.

In 1961, American Airlines was operating an eastbound multi-stop transcontinental flight with a Boeing 707 jetliner on a Los Angeles - Fort Worth - New Orleans - Miami routing in association with Delta Air Lines and National Airlines as an interchange transport hub service jointly operated by the three air carriers in addition to American flying a northbound service operated with a Douglas DC-6 propliner on a routing of Fort Worth - Dallas Love Field - Tulsa - St. Louis - Chicago Midway Airport - Detroit - Buffalo, NY.  At this same time, American was also flying  Lockheed L-188 Electra turboprop service on several routes from the airport including an eastbound service operating Fort Worth - Dallas Love Field - Washington D.C. National Airport - Philadelphia - New York City LaGuardia Airport as well as another eastbound flight operating Fort Worth - Little Rock - Memphis - New York City Idlewild Airport (now JFK Airport) - Hartford and also a northbound routing of Fort Worth - Dallas Love Field - Oklahoma City - Tulsa - St. Louis.  The airline was also operating another multi-stop transcontinental flight at this time with a DC-6 operating an eastbound "milk run" routing of Los Angeles - San Diego - Phoenix - Tucson - El Paso - Fort Worth - Memphis, TN - Nashville - Knoxville - Washington D.C. National Airport - New York City LaGuardia Airport.  In addition, American was operating Douglas DC-7 propliner service from the airport at this time as well including an eastbound flight operating Fort Worth - Dallas Love Field - Nashville - Louisville - Cincinnati - Columbus, OH - New York City Idlewild Airport.

Passenger service during the mid and late 1960s

Several airlines were continuing to serve Greater Southwest International Airport during the mid 1960s including Braniff International with nonstop service between GSW and Houston Hobby Airport operated with British Aircraft Corporation BAC One-Eleven twinjets and Lockheed L-188 Electra turboprops, Continental Airlines with nonstop Vickers Viscount turboprop service to Midland/Odessa, TX, and Eastern Airlines with direct, no change of plane Boeing 727-100 jet service to New Orleans, Tampa and Orlando via a first stop at Dallas Love Field.  Also during the mid 1960s, American Airlines was operating Boeing 727-100 service into Greater Southwest twice a day with a westbound flight routing of New York LaGuardia Airport - Chicago O'Hare Airport - Fort Worth - El Paso - Los Angeles and an eastbound flight routing of Los Angeles - El Paso - Fort Worth - Oklahoma City.  In addition, Delta was serving the airport during the mid 1960s with a Convair 440 twin prop "milk run" flight on a westbound routing of Charleston, SC - Columbia, SC - Atlanta - Columbus, GA - Montgomery, AL - Jackson, MS - Monroe, LA - Shreveport - Dallas Love Field - Fort Worth with this service then changing flight numbers at the airport and making the short hop back to Love Field.  In 1966, Trans-Texas Airways (TTa) was operating three daily departures from GSW with nonstop service to Brownwood, TX and Dallas Love Field as well as direct one stop service to Austin, TX and San Angelo, TX flown with twin prop Convair 240 and Douglas DC-3 aircraft.  In the summer of 1967, Central Airlines, which was based in Fort Worth, was operating just one departure a day from the airport flown with a Convair 600 turboprop on a round trip "milk run" routing of Fort Worth - Dallas Love Field - Fort Smith, AR - Fayetteville, AR - Joplin, MO - Kansas City, MO.  By the fall of 1967, Central had been acquired by and merged into the original Frontier Airlines (1950-1986) which continued to operate just one departure a day from the airport on the same round trip "milk run" routing between Fort Worth and Kansas City flown with a Convair 580 turboprop.  In 1968, Braniff International was also operating a "milk run" flight serving the airport every weekday with a Lockheed L-188 Electra propjet flying a westbound and then southbound routing of Memphis, TN - Little Rock, AR - Fort Smith, AR - Tulsa, OK - Dallas Love Field - Fort Worth - Houston Hobby Airport - Corpus Christi, TX.  Also by the late 1960s, Continental was operating Douglas DC-9-10 jet service into the airport.

Decline and closure
In 1964 the Federal Aviation Administration, tired of funding separate airports for Dallas and Fort Worth, announced that it would no longer support both. The Civil Aeronautics Board ordered the two cities to finally come up with a plan for a regional airport, and in 1965 a parcel of land north of Greater Southwest was selected for Dallas Fort Worth International Airport. As traffic boomed at Dallas Love Field, it slumped at Fort Worth as most carriers ceased serving GSW; the last air carrier to do so, American Airlines, left around the end of 1968. When Dallas-Fort Worth International opened in 1974, the FAA closed the runways at Greater Southwest.  The airfield is no longer in existence.

Training flight operations
Following the cessation of all scheduled air carrier service in the late 1960s, the airfield continued to be used for airline training flights.  On May 30, 1972, Delta Air Lines Flight 9570 crashed at Greater Southwest International Airport while performing "touch and go" training landings and take offs. The federal National Transportation Safety Board (NTSB) determined that wake turbulence from another training flight, an American Airlines DC-10 widebody jetliner, had caused the Delta DC-9-14 twin jet to lose control as it neared touchdown. As this was a training flight, only four people were on board flight 9570: three crew and an FAA operations inspector. All were killed.

Redevelopment following closure

Following the closure of the airport, Runway 17/35 became Amon Carter Boulevard for several years before it was torn up and replaced with an actual street.  a small section of the taxiway and run-up area of Runway 18 still exists on the north side of State Highway 183. American Airlines expanded its headquarters to new buildings on the airport site during the 1980s and 1990s (the airline's former hangar had remained in use as a reservations center for several years before it was demolished). The airport's IATA airport code, GSW, is still in use by the American Airlines Flight Academy, which sits across State Highway 360 from the airport site.

References

External links 
 GSW at Abandoned & Little-Known Airfields

Airports in Fort Worth, Texas
Defunct airports in Texas
Airports established in 1953
Airports disestablished in 1974